is a retired Japanese badminton player. He competed at the 2016 Rio and 2020 Tokyo Summer Olympics. In 2009, he joined the Unisys badminton team.

Career 
Endo won the 1st point in the Thomas Cup finals with Kenichi Hayakawa beating Tan Boon Heong and Hoon Thien How and led the momentum for the Japanese team to claim the Thomas Cup for the first time, being the fourth nation to win the Thomas cup after Indonesia, China and Malaysia. Known for his defensive skills alongside his knowledge of the game, Endo has reached the finals of the All England Open tournament a total of 5 times, being the runner up three times with his then partner, Kenichi Hayakawa and winning back to back titles, defending his 2020 All England Open title in 2021 with his current partner, Yuta Watanabe.

In July 2021, Endo competed at the 2020 Summer Olympics in the men's doubles partnering Yuta Watanabe. They were stopped in the quarter-finals, losing to Lee Yang and Wang Chi-lin, the eventual champions, in straight games.

Retirement
At the beginning of September 2021 Hiroyuki Endo, at that time World No. 5 together with Yuta Watanabe, decided to resign from the Japanese National badminton team. This announcement just after the 2020 Tokyo Olympics was made together with the announcement of retirements of men's doubles compatriots Keigo Sonoda and Takeshi Kamura. Endo, already 34 at the time of his retirement, wanted his partner Yuta Watanabe to fully concentrate on playing men’s doubles with him and stop playing mixed doubles for some time. When he could not come to an agreement with Watanabe, he chose to retire. Meanwhile Yuta, because he won the mixed doubles bronze medal in the Tokyo 2020 Olympics, still wanted to play both disciplines. “Thank you for your hard work as a National representative! You stayed as an A team member for 13 years. You piled up the endurance day by day. I guess you could do it because you hate to lose. I know you have been going through a lot of things, but you are amazing!” wrote Endo’s wife on twitter. Endo became coach of his badminton club Nihon Unisys in Japan after his retirement.

Achievements

BWF World Championships 
Men's doubles

Asian Championships 
Men's doubles

BWF World Tour (4 titles, 5 runners-up) 
The BWF World Tour, which was announced on 19 March 2017 and implemented in 2018, is a series of elite badminton tournaments sanctioned by the Badminton World Federation (BWF). The BWF World Tour is divided into levels of World Tour Finals, Super 1000, Super 750, Super 500, Super 300 (part of the HSBC World Tour), and the BWF Tour Super 100.

Men's doubles

BWF Superseries (7 runners-up) 
The BWF Superseries, which was launched on 14 December 2006 and implemented in 2007, was a series of elite badminton tournaments, sanctioned by the Badminton World Federation (BWF). BWF Superseries levels were Superseries and Superseries Premier. A season of Superseries consisted of twelve tournaments around the world that had been introduced since 2011. Successful players were invited to the Superseries Finals, which were held at the end of each year.

Men's doubles

  BWF Superseries Finals tournament
  BWF Superseries Premier tournament
  BWF Superseries tournament

BWF Grand Prix (3 titles, 3 runners-up) 
The BWF Grand Prix had two levels, the Grand Prix and Grand Prix Gold. It was a series of badminton tournaments sanctioned by the Badminton World Federation (BWF) and played between 2007 and 2017.

Men's doubles

  BWF Grand Prix Gold tournament
  BWF Grand Prix tournament

BWF International Challenge/Series (1 runner-up) 
Men's doubles

  BWF International Challenge tournament
  BWF International Series tournament

References

External links 
 
 
 
 

1986 births
Living people
Sportspeople from Saitama Prefecture
Japanese male badminton players
Badminton players at the 2016 Summer Olympics
Badminton players at the 2020 Summer Olympics
Olympic badminton players of Japan
Badminton players at the 2010 Asian Games
Badminton players at the 2014 Asian Games
Asian Games competitors for Japan
21st-century Japanese people